Sabīne Niedola (born April 29, 1991 in Liepāja) is a Latvian women's basketball player currently playing for SK Cēsis and the Latvian national team. She previously played for BK Liepājas Metalurgs and Nantes Rezé. Niedola contributed to the Latvian national team's success in the EuroBasket 2009.

Club career
  Liepājas Metalurgs (2006–10), TTT Riga (2011)
  Nantes Rezé (2010–11)
  Sedís (2012–2014)
  SK Cēsis (2014–2015 )
  Saarlouis Royals (2015- )

Achievements
 2009 - 7th place in Eurobasket Women with Latvia women's national basketball team.
 2009 - 3rd place in Latvian women basketball league with BK Liepājas Metalurgs.

References

Sabīne Niedola: "Izvēlos Eiropu" (1. daļa)

External links
Profile at FIBA Europe page

1991 births
Living people
Sportspeople from Liepāja
Latvian women's basketball players
Power forwards (basketball)